Andrew Douglas Gilfillan (born 21 August 1959) is a South African former first-class cricketer.

Gilfillan was born at Johannesburg in August 1959. He later studied in England at Worcester College at the University of Oxford. While studying at Oxford, he played first-class cricket for Oxford University in 1982, making three appearances against Kent, Gloucestershire and Hampshire. He scored 40 runs in his three matches, with a high score of 33, while with his leg break bowling he took 2 wickets, with both coming against Kent with Gilfillan taking the wickets of Neil Taylor and Chris Cowdrey.

References

External links

1959 births
Living people
Cricketers from Johannesburg
Alumni of Worcester College, Oxford
South African cricketers
Oxford University cricketers
South African expatriate sportspeople in England
Alumni of Hilton College (South Africa)